Mogulones is a genus of minute seed weevils in the family of beetles known as Curculionidae. There are at least 30 described species in Mogulones.

Species
These 37 species belong to the genus Mogulones:

 Mogulones abbreviatulus (Fabricius, J.C., 1792) c g
 Mogulones annibal (Desbrochers, 1896) g
 Mogulones arcasi (C.Brisout de Barneville, 1869) g
 Mogulones aubei (Boheman, 1845) g
 Mogulones audisioi Colonnelli, 1987 c
 Mogulones austriacus (C.Brisout, 1869) g
 Mogulones biondii Colonnelli, 1992 c
 Mogulones borraginis (Fabricius, J.C., 1792) c g
 Mogulones crucifer (Pallas, 1771) c g b (Hound's-tongue root weevil)
 Mogulones cynoglossi (Frauenfeld, 1866) g
 Mogulones deiectus Colonnelli, 1992 c
 Mogulones diecki (H.Brisout, 1870) g
 Mogulones dimidiatus (Frivaldszky, 1865) g
 Mogulones geographicus (Goeze, J.A.E., 1777) c g
 Mogulones gratiosus (C.Brisout de Barneville, 1869) g
 Mogulones grisescens (Pic, 1940) g
 Mogulones humicola Colonnelli, 2005 c
 Mogulones hungaricus (C.Brisout, 1869) g
 Mogulones hyrcanus Korotyaev, 1992 c
 Mogulones javetii (Gerhardt, 1867) g
 Mogulones koreanus Korotyaev, 1994 c
 Mogulones kwoni Korotyaev & Hong, 2004 c
 Mogulones lewisi Colonnelli, 1986 c
 Mogulones lobanovi Korotyaev, 1992 c
 Mogulones lodosianus Colonnelli, 1987 c
 Mogulones lopezi Colonnelli, 1986 c
 Mogulones pallidicornis (Gougelet & Brisout de Barneville, 1860) g
 Mogulones pseudopollinarius Colonnelli, 1991 c
 Mogulones raphani (Fabricius, J.C., 1792) c g
 Mogulones rheophilus Colonnelli, 2005 c
 Mogulones sahini Gültekin & Colonnelli, 2006 c
 Mogulones sainteclairei (H.Wagner, 1927) g
 Mogulones soricinus (C.Brisout, 1869) g
 Mogulones sublineellus (C.Brisout, 1869) g
 Mogulones tatyanae Korotyaev, 1992 c
 Mogulones venedicus (Weise, 1879) g
 Mogulones vittatipennis Colonnelli, 1986 c

Data sources: i = ITIS, c = Catalogue of Life, g = GBIF, b = Bugguide.net

References

Further reading

External links

 

Ceutorhynchini